Henry V is a 1944 British Technicolor epic  film adaptation of William Shakespeare's play of the same title. The on-screen title is The Chronicle History of King Henry the Fifth with His Battell Fought at Agincourt in France (derived from the title of the 1600 quarto edition of the play, though changing the spelling from "Agin Court"). It stars Laurence Olivier, who also directed. The play was adapted for the screen by Olivier, Dallas Bower, and Alan Dent. The score is by William Walton.

The film was made near the end of World War II and was intended as a morale booster for Britain. Consequently, it was partly funded by the British government. The film was originally "dedicated to the 'Commandos and Airborne Troops of Great Britain the spirit of whose ancestors it has been humbly attempted to recapture.  The film won Olivier an Academy Honorary Award for "his Outstanding achievement as actor, producer and director in bringing Henry V to the screen."

Plot
(The action moves from a performance of the play, Henry V, in 1600, transitioning to the Battle of Agincourt in 1415, then back to the play.)

A panorama of London in 1600 is shown and then the viewpoint travels to the Globe Theatre where the audience is being seated. The Chorus enters and implores the audience to use their imagination to visualise the setting of the play. Then is seen, up on a balcony, two clergymen, the Archbishop of Canterbury and the Bishop of Ely, discussing the current affairs of state. Henry then enters, and discusses with his nobles the state of France. A gift is delivered to Henry from the French Dauphin. The gift turns out to be tennis balls, a jibe at Henry's youth and inexperience. Offended, Henry sends the French ambassador away, and prepares to claim the French throne, a throne that he believes is rightfully his.

Then characters from Shakespeare's Henry IV plays, Corporal Nym, Bardolph, and Pistol, are shown. These characters resolve to join Henry's army; however, before they do, Falstaff, another returning character, and one of the King's former mentors, dies. At this point, the action moves to Southampton and out of the Globe.

At Southampton, the fleet embarks, and lands in France, beginning a campaign that tears through France to Harfleur, to which Henry's forces lay siege. At the siege, Henry delivers his first rousing speech to his troops: "Once more... unto the breach! Dear friends, once more!" The troops charge on Harfleur, and take it as their own.

The troops then march to Agincourt, meeting the French forces. The night before the impending battle, Henry wanders around the camp in disguise, to find out what the men think of him. The next day, before the battle, Henry delivers his famous Saint Crispin's Day speech.

The action transitions from the Globe to the fields of the Battle of Agincourt in 1415. The English archers let forth a volley of arrows that cuts deeply into the French numbers. The French, weighed down by their heavy armour, are caught in the fresh mud of the field, and are bogged down, which gives the English troops ample opportunity to ride out and fight them on equal terms. The French Dauphin, seeing this disadvantage, watches as several bodyguards and noblemen including the Constable of France ride toward the English camp and kill all the boys and squires, prompting a tearful Fluellen to cry that "this is expressly against the law of arms". Henry is angered by this and rides out to meet the French Constable, whom he defeats in personal combat.

The battle is won. Henry comes to discuss peace and then woos the Princess Katherine. His success means that France is now under the control of England, as the French King, Charles VI, adopts Henry as his successor. In the final moments, the viewpoint returns to the Globe Theatre and the play, where the actors take their bows.

Cast
{{Cast listing|
 Laurence Olivier as King Henry V of England. Henry is the King of England who, believing he has a justifiable claim to the throne of France derived from his great-grandfather Edward III, invades France, a decision that is further strengthed when the French Dauphin sends an emissary to insult the young king. He is a warrior king, who commands his troops from the front. This was Laurence Olivier's third Oscar-nominated performance, and his second appearance in a Shakespeare film.
 Renée Asherson as Princess Katherine. Katherine is wooed by Henry and becomes his wife.
 Robert Newton as Ancient Pistol.
 Leslie Banks as the Chorus. The Chorus sets the scene for the play and film, giving the required exposition. Leslie Banks was an actor who had appeared with Olivier in Fire Over England.
 Felix Aylmer as the Archbishop of Canterbury. The Archbishop helps tempt the King into his conquest of France. Olivier stages this scene partly as comedy, with the actor who plays the Archbishop in the Globe Theatre comically jumbling all his papers and losing his place in the script. Aylmer had appeared with Olivier in As You Like It, and would subsequently appear in Hamlet.
 Robert Helpmann as the Bishop of Ely. The Bishop helps the Archbishop in his persuasion of the King. In the film, he appears as a comic figure.
 Vernon Greeves as The English Herald.
 Gerald Case as the Earl of Westmoreland.
 Griffith Jones as the Earl of Salisbury. Salisbury is a commander who fights at Harfleur and Agincourt.
 Morland Graham as Sir Thomas Erpingham. Erpingham plays a decisive role in the Battle of Agincourt.
 Nicholas Hannen as the Duke of Exeter. The Duke is the uncle to the king.
 Michael Warre as the Duke of Gloucester. Gloucester is the brother to the king.
 Ralph Truman as Mountjoy, The French Herald'.
 Ernest Thesiger as Duke of Berri, French Ambassador.
 Frederick Cooper as Corporal Nym.
 Roy Emerton as Lieutenant Bardolph.
 Freda Jackson as Mistress Quickly.
 George Cole as the Boy.
 George Robey as Sir John Falstaff. Falstaff is a companion to Henry.
 Harcourt Williams as King Charles VI of France. Charles is the sick and old King of France. Williams later appeared as the First Player in the Laurence Olivier Hamlet, but his monologue on the death of Priam was omitted from the film.
 Russell Thorndike as the Duke of Bourbon. Bourbon fights at Agincourt and is captured. Thorndike appeared in all three of Olivier's Shakespearean films.
 Leo Genn as The Constable of France. The Constable was the commander of the French forces at Agincourt, and is killed by King Henry himself during the battle.
 Francis Lister as the Duke of Orleans. Orleans is a nobleman who fights at Agincourt.
 Max Adrian as The Dauphin. The Dauphin is the cocky joint-commander of the forces at Agincourt.
 Jonathan Field as The French Messenger.
 Esmond Knight as Fluellen, Welsh Captain in the English Army. Knight appeared in all three of Olivier's Shakespearean films, as well as his The Prince and the Showgirl.
 Michael Shepley as Gower, Captain in the English Army.
 John Laurie as Jamy, Scottish Captain in the English Army. Laurie appeared in all three of Olivier's Shakespearean films.
 Niall MacGinnis as MacMorris, Irish Captain in the English Army.
 Frank Tickle as The Governor of Harfleur.
 Ivy St. Helier as Alice.
 Janet Burnell as Queen Isabel of France. Isabel is the wife of Charles.
 Brian Nissen as Court, Soldier in the English Army.
 Arthur Hambling as Bates, Soldier in the English Army.
 Jimmy Hanley as Williams, Soldier in the English Army.
 Ernest Hare as A Priest. The priest weds Henry and Katherine.
 Valentine Dyall as the Duke of Burgundy. A great power in Europe, he serves as mediator between the kings of England and France.
}}

Production
Winston Churchill instructed Olivier to fashion the film as morale-boosting propaganda for British troops fighting World War II. The making and release of the film coincided with the Allied invasion of Normandy and push into France. An early preview trailer of the film showed contemporary London just before cutting to the film's aerial footage of London in 1600. The film was meant to cost £350,000 but ended up costing nearly £500,000.

Setting
Much of the film's impact comes from the vivid Technicolor cinematography (using the only Technicolor camera in England at the time), spectacular period costumes and a unique blend of stylized settings, miniatures and location shooting. The film begins with a handbill floating out of the sky setting the date—the first of May, 1600–and the occasion. This dissolves into a tremendously detailed miniature model of London, with boats moving on the Thames. The camera pulls away from the Tower, gleaming white in the sun, and moves past London Bridge (crowded with buildings) to aim across the river at the densely packed city studded with churches, stretching into the distance, until St. Paul's (as it was then) can be seen. The camera pauses for a beat and then moves back to zoom in on one of the two round theatres, where a man is raising a flag inscribed The Globe Playhouse, showing that a performance is imminent. Then we go into the theatre for a vivid recreation of a production of the play as performed at that time, complete with hecklers and an annoying rain shower. The Chorus (a single actor) invokes the audience's imaginations, and when the action in the play moves to Southampton, we enter the world of the Trés Riches Heures of the Duc de Berry, a late medieval Book of Hours. (The Duke actually appears among the nobles with the King of France.) The setting becomes more natural in the dark night before Agincourt, when Henry goes into the sleeping camp to see how it goes with his men. The Battle of Agincourt takes place in a realistic setting (filmed in Ireland), in natural fields and forests, and dialogue is delivered from the backs of restive chargers. The troops singing Non Nobis and Te Deum at Henry's bidding march toward a painted rendition of the château, which fades out and fades in to the same image, blanketed in deep snow. The next set is a near-perfect rendition of the often-reproduced February page from the Trés Riches Heures, with Pistol taking the place of the man warming himself in the cottage (but with greater modesty). We next see the negotiations for the Treaty of Troyes, and  the setting is used to great effect to clarify and increase the impact of the Duke of Burgundy's speech about the sorry state of France. The camera moves out through a window to pan over a painting of the neglected countryside, specifically illustrating each line of the speech and pausing on the neglected children before panning back up to the château. Henry's courtship of Princess Katherine weaves through a lacework of Gothic arches and is followed by their marriage, which cuts abruptly to the Globe and the two actors (a boy playing Katherine) similarly standing in front of their thrones, with the audience applauding. After Chorus speaks his epilogue, the camera pulls back so we can see the flag being taken down and returns again to the model. Then the credits roll by, but before the picture ends we return to the model one last time—shot of the Tower of London gleaming white on the banks of the Thames.

Screenplay
Olivier intentionally left out some of Henry's harsher actions as Shakespeare portrayed them – such as his remorseless beheading of the three Southampton Plot traitors:  Richard of Conisburgh, 3rd Earl of Cambridge; Henry Scrope, 3rd Baron Scrope of Masham; and Sir Thomas Grey; his threat to unleash his troops to rape and pillage Harfleur if the city refused to surrender; the cutting of the throats of French prisoners during the battle at Agincourt; as well as his refusal to stop the hanging of his old friend Bardolph for looting. The Chorus’ last speech contains a melancholy reference to what came after and is not in the film:

Henry the Sixth, in infant bands crown'd King
Of France and England, did this king succeed;
Whose state so many had the managing,
That they lost France and made his England bleed:

Casting
Hundreds of locals were hired as extras for the Agincourt battle scenes filmed in neutral Ireland in 1943. The production company paid an additional pound to anyone who brought his own horse.

Olivier agreed not to appear in another film for 18 months to reduce any detraction from the promotion of Henry V. In return, he was paid £15,000, tax-free (about £460,000 in today's money).

Esmond Knight, who plays the patriotic Welsh soldier Fluellen was a wounded veteran of the war. He had only just regained some sight in his right eye.

Filming

The film was shot on location at the Powerscourt Estate in Enniskerry, County Wicklow, Ireland. The interior sets were constructed at the Denham Studios in Buckinghamshire, England. They were based on illustrations from the Très Riches Heures du Duc de Berry the illustrator of which is also a character in the play.

The film, which was photographed in three-strip Technicolor, was hailed by critics for its ebulliently colourful sets and costumes, as well as for Olivier's masterful direction and acting. Pauline Kael called the movie "a triumph of color, music, spectacle and soaring heroic poetry". James Agee reported, in Time magazine's 8 April 1946 issue, that a remarkable 75 percent of the color footage shot was used in the final release.

In 2007, the film was digitally restored to High Definition format and re-released. As part of the BBC Summer of British Film series in 2007, it was shown at selected cinemas across the UK.

Film music

The score by William Walton is considered a classic film score, and excerpts from it, such as the orchestral Suite from Henry V, have been performed in concert. 

Reception
According to Turner Classic Movies's  Frank Miller, Olivier's Henry V was the first Shakespeare film to receive "both critical and popular acclaim." The British critics gave it a lukewarm welcome but word of mouth took care of that, and the film broke all records by running for 11 months in London. In 1946, a cagey release strategy in the United States was undoubtedly helped by the "ecstatic" reviews from U.S. critics, "hailing it as one of the screen's first great works of art and the most impressive directing debut since Orson Welles' Citizen Kane (1941)."

Miller adds that "Olivier won Best Actor awards from the New York Film Critics Circle and the National Review, also capturing the latter's Best Picture award and coming within a few votes of beating The Best Years of Our Lives (1946) for the New York Film Critics Award in that category."

The film was highly acclaimed around the world. James Agee, who reviewed it separately for three publications, called it "one of the cinema's great works of art".

Box office
According to Kinematograph Weekly the 'biggest winner' at the box office in 1945 Britain was The Seventh Veil, with "runners up" being (in release order), Madonna of the Seven Moons, Old Acquaintance, Frenchman's Creek, Mrs Parkington, Arsenic and Old Lace, Meet Me in St Louis, A Song to Remember, Since You Went Away, Here Come the Waves, Tonight and Every Night, Hollywood Canteen, They Were Sisters, The Princess and the Pirate, The Adventures of Susan, National Velvet, Mrs Skefflington, I Live in Grosvenor Square, Nob Hill, Perfect Strangers, Valley of Decision, Conflict and Duffy's Tavern. British "runners up" were They Were Sisters, I Live in Grosvenor Square, Perfect Strangers, Madonna of the Seven Moons, Waterloo Road, Blithe Spirit, The Way to the Stars, I'll Be Your Sweetheart, Dead of Night, Waltz Time and Henry V.

Previous efforts to put Shakespeare on the screen included Mary Pickford's 1929 The Taming of the Shrew; Max Reinhardt's 1935 A Midsummer Night's Dream for Warner Bros; a British film adaptation of As You Like It starring Olivier and Elisabeth Bergner and scored by William Walton; and MGM's 1936 Romeo and Juliet, directed by George Cukor and starring Norma Shearer and Leslie Howard. They had all misfired. According to TCM.com "After screening Romeo and Juliet (1936), Olivier realized that the standard Hollywood camera style, which included moving in for a close-up at climactic moments, didn't work for Shakespeare. In one scene, the close up had forced Norma Shearer to whisper one of her most passionate lines. Instead, he decided to film long speeches starting in close up and then moving the camera back as the actor's intensity grew. He also decided to treat the soliloquies not as direct addresses to the audience, but as interior monologues".

The film earned over $1 million in rentals in the US. However, due to its high production cost and Entertainment Tax it did not go into profit for Rank until 1949. It earned United Artists a profit of $1.62 million. In 2007, Military History magazine listed this production 75th among "The 100 Greatest War Movies".

Academy Awards

See also
 BFI Top 100 British films
 List of films with a 100% rating on Rotten Tomatoes, a film review aggregator website

References

Bibliography
 The Great British Films, Jerry Vermilye, 1978, Citadel Press, 
 Sargeant, Amy. British Cinema: a Critical History''. London: BFI Publishing, 2005.

External links
 
 
 Henry V an essay by Bruce Eder at The Criterion Collection 
 Literature on Henry V

1944 films
1944 drama films
British drama films
Films directed by Laurence Olivier
1944 directorial debut films
Films shot at Denham Film Studios
British epic films
Films based on Henry V (play)
Two Cities Films films
Films set in the 1410s
Films set in the 15th century
Films set in London
Films scored by William Walton
Hundred Years' War films
Films shot in County Wicklow
1940s English-language films
1940s British films